Ribsden Holt is a former royal residence at Windlesham, Surrey, England that was the home of Princess Louise, Duchess of Argyll and Lady Patricia Ramsay. Today it is also called Ribsden Hall.

History
The house, set back behind a long drive, was built in the late 1870s for  English lawyer Henry Cadogan Rothery. Following Rothery's death in 1888. His widow Madelaine lived there until her death in October 1891. Richard Copley Christie, also an English lawyer, and his wife Mary Helen (daughter of Samuel Fletcher MP) bought the property around 1892. Christie died at Ribsden in January 1901 and his widow died there in February 1911. Princess Louise, Duchess of Argyll for a time from its sale by auction in 1911 until 1939. After her residency, it was occupied by Lady Patricia Ramsay (and her husband, Sir Alexander Ramsay) from 1939 until her death in 1974. After her death, the house passed into private ownership.

References

Country houses in Surrey
Royal residences in the United Kingdom